Heart of the Congos is a roots reggae album by The Congos, produced by Lee "Scratch" Perry at his Black Ark studio with a studio band including Boris Gardiner on bass and Ernest Ranglin on guitar. The album was released in 1977. It is noted as being one of Perry's masterpiece productions of the Black Ark era.

The first issue of the LP in Jamaica was a very limited release said to consist of only several hundred copies. It was remastered using the original Black Ark quarter inch master tapes with the exception of 'At The Feast' and re-released in 1996 on the Blood & Fire label, run by Steve Barrow, T Elwing, and Mick Hucknall, with assistance on the ground provided by Andrea Lewis (Jamaica). The original mix of the album was not officially re-issued on either LP or CD until 2017's 40th Anniversary Edition (although an 'unofficial' CD release, sourced from the original LP, was released in 2004 by CORN-FED Productions, based in Amsterdam). Until 2017, all editions subsequent to the first Jamaica release feature a second, substantially different, mix by Lee Perry. The 40th Anniversary Edition includes both mixes of the album, as well as ten bonus tracks.

The album was listed in the 1999 book The Rough Guide: Reggae: 100 Essential CDs.

Pitchfork Media ranked the record at #46 on its "Top 100 Albums of the 1970s".

Track listing
All tracks written by Cedric Myton and Roydel Johnson, except tracks 1 and 2 written by Cedric Myton, Roydel Johnson and Lee Perry.

Side one
"Fisherman"
"Congoman"
"Open Up the Gate"
"Children Crying"
"La La Bam-Bam"

Side two
"Can't Come In"
"Sodom and Gomorrow"
"The Wrong Thing"
"Ark of the Covenant"
"Solid Foundation"

1996 CD track listing

CD one (Remix)
"Fisherman"
"Congoman"
"Open up the Gate"
"Children Crying"
"La La Bam-Bam"
"Can't Come In"
"Sodom and Gomorrow"
"The Wrong Thing"
"Ark of the Covenant"
"Solid Foundation"
"At the Feast"
"Nicodemus"

CD two
"Congoman" (12" mix)
"Congoman Chant"
"Bring the Mackaback"
"Noah Sugar Pan"
"Solid Foundation" (Disco Cork Mix)

2017 40th Anniversary Edition CD track listing

CD one (Remix)
"Fisherman"
"Congoman"
"Open up the Gate"
"Children Crying"
"La La Bam-Bam"
"Can't Come In"
"Sodom and Gomorrow"
"The Wrong Thing"
"Ark of the Covenant"
"Solid Foundation"

CD two (Bonus Tracks)

"Don't Blame It On I"
"At The Feast"
"Neckodeemus"
"Solid Foundation (Disco Cork Mix)"
"Foundation Dub"
"Congoman (12" Mix)"
"Congoman Chant"
"Bring The Mackaback"
"Fisherman Dub"
"Noah Sugar Pan"

CD three (Original mix)
"Fisherman"
"Congoman"
"Open up the Gate"
"Children Crying"
"La La Bam-Bam"
"Can't Come In"
"Sodom and Gomorrow"
"The Wrong Thing"
"Ark of the Covenant"
"Solid Foundation"

Personnel
Produced by The Congos and Lee "Scratch" Perry.
Recorded at the Black Ark 1976–77, Cardiff Crescent, Washington Gardens, Kingston, Jamaica.

The Congos – Cedric Myton and Roy "Ashanti" Johnson
Boris Gardiner, Geoffrey Chung on "Fisherman" - bass
Lowell "Sly" Dunbar, Mikey "Boo" Richards, Paul Douglas on "Fisherman" - drums
Robert "Billy" Johnson - rhythm guitar
Ernest Ranglin - lead guitar
Winston "Brubeck" Wright - organ, bass on "Congoman"
Keith Sterling - piano
Noel "Skully" Simms, Uziah "Sticky" Thompson, Lee Perry - percussion
The Meditations, Watty "King" Burnett, Gregory Isaacs (on "La La Bam-Bam"), Earl Morgan and Barry Llewellyn (on "La La Bam-Bam"), Candy McKenzie (on "Children Crying") - backing vocals

References

The Congos albums
1977 debut albums
Albums produced by Lee "Scratch" Perry